Jānis Kalniņš may refer to:

 Jānis Kalniņš (composer) (1904–2000), Latvian Canadian composer and conductor
 Jānis Kalniņš (ice hockey) (born 1991), Latvian ice hockey goaltender